Christmastime (released as Noëls Sans Passeport  in France and Christmas with the Swingle Singers in the Netherlands) is an album of Christmas songs released by the Swingle Singers in 1968 on the Philips Records label.  It was reissued with the title Christmas Album (1980). All tracks from this album are also included on the 11 disk Philips boxed set, Swingle Singers.

Track listing
Medley: "Jingle Bells" (Pierpont) / "Il Est Ne Le Divin Enfant" / "Es Ist Ein Ros' Entsprungen" – 3:47
Medley: "God Rest Ye Merry Gentlemen" / "The First Nowell" / "Go Tell It On the Mountain" – 3:13
"Stille Nacht, Heilige Nacht" ("Silent Night")	 (Gruber, Mohr) – 2:35
Medley: "Deck The Halls With Boughs Of Holly" / "What Child Is This?" – 3:12
Medley: "O Jul Med Din Glede" / "Komt, Verwondert U Hier Mensen" / "Away in a Manger" – 3:53
Medley: "Les Anges dans nos Campagnes" / "Oh Tannenbaum" / "Bel Astre Que J'Adore"  – 3:15
Medley: "El Noi de la Mare" / "Hanej, Nynej, Jezisku" ("Rocking Carol") / "Canzone Dei Zampognari" – 2:46
Medley: "We Three Kings Of Orient Are" (Hopkins) / "The Holly And The Ivy" – 3:11
"White Christmas", (Irving Berlin) – 2:12
Medley: "Stchedrivka" ("Carol of the Bells") / "Dag Visen" / "O Sanctissima" – 3:09

Personnel
Pierre Fatosme – producer, engineer
Vocals:
Jeanette Baucomont – soprano
Christiane Legrand – soprano
Hélène Devos – alto
Claudine Meunier – alto
Ward Swingle – tenor, arranger
Joseph Noves – tenor
Jean Cussac– bass
José Germain – bass
Rhythm section:
Guy Pedersen – double bass
Daniel Humair or Bernard Lubat – drums

References / external links

Philips 600-282, Philips 844858, Philips 548303, Philips Festivo 6570 220
Christmastime at [ Allmusic.com]

The Swingle Singers albums
1968 Christmas albums
Christmas albums by French artists
French-language albums
Jazz Christmas albums
Philips Records albums
Pop Christmas albums